The Cathedral Group is the group of the tallest mountains of the Teton Range, all of which are located in Grand Teton National Park in the U.S. state of Wyoming. The Cathedral Group are classic alpine peaks, with pyramidal shapes caused by glacial motion. The Cathedral Group is separated by other tall peaks of the range by the Cascade Canyon to the north and Avalanche Canyon to the south.

Half the remaining dozen glaciers in the Teton Range are located in this cluster of high peaks, including the Teton Glacier which is the largest one in the range. Other glaciers such as the Middle Teton Glacier, Teepe Glacier, and Schoolroom Glacier are also located here. The Cathedral Group has several high cirques, arêtes as well as hanging and U-shaped valleys which are all the work of glacial activity. At the base of the Cathedral Group, several glacial lakes can be found, including Jenny, Bradley and Taggart Lakes, all of which were formed when the glaciers of the last ice age retreated, leaving behind terminal moraines which acted as natural dams. A few high altitude lakes can also be found scattered among the peaks.

Mountains of the Cathedral Group

Some geographers only include Grand Teton, Mount Owen and Teewinot Mountain as being a part of the Cathedral Group proper; however, similarity of shapes and the isolation from other high peaks of the range by the deep Cascade and Death Canyons, generally place all the major peaks located between the two canyons within the group.

References

External links
 

Mountains of Grand Teton National Park
Mountains of Wyoming
Mountains of Teton County, Wyoming

de:Cathedral Group